Rari Nantes Arenzano is an Italian water polo club based in Arenzano, Liguria.

History 
RN Arenzano founded on October 18, 1967. Twenty-one years later the club won its first title, the Italian Cup, also the next year, in 1988–89 season participated in LEN Cup Winners' Cup where it reached the final and won the trophy against the Hungarian Spartacus from Budapest.

Honours 
Men
 Coppa Italia
 Winners (1): 1987-88
LEN Cup Winners' Cup
 Winners (1): 1988-89

External links 
 Official site

References 

Water polo clubs in Liguria
Water polo clubs in Italy
Sport in Liguria
Sports clubs established in 1967
1967 establishments in Italy